The 1932 Detroit City College Tartars football team represented Detroit City College (later renamed Wayne State University) as an independent during the 1932 college football season. The team compiled a 1–6 record and was outscored by its opponents by a combined total of 95 to 10.

Joe Gembis was hired as the team's head coach in July 1932. He succeeded Norman Wann as head coach. Gembis, a native of Vicksburg, Michigan, had played fullback for the Michigan Wolverines football team from 1927 to 1929; he coached Chesapeake High School in Chesapeake, Ohio, to a 14-4 record in 1931. Gembis agreed to coach the Detroit City College team in exchange for post graduate work.

On October 8, the Tartars defeated Toledo, 3–0, for their only victory of the 1932 season. Dan Dobbins, a substitute halfback, kicked a field goal in the last eight seconds.

During Gembis' 14-year tenure as the school's head football coach, the team began playing a higher caliber of opponents, including regular games against regular Michigan State, the University of Detroit, Central Michigan, Western Michigan, Eastern Michigan, Cincinnati, and Bowling Green.  Gembis compiled an overall record of 42–51–8 at Detroit City College/Wayne University.

Schedule

References

Detroit City College
Wayne State Warriors football seasons
Detroit City College Tartars football